Bullseye is a Bull Terrier and the official mascot of Target Corporation. The dog is featured in Target's commercial campaigns and in store sale signage and is used in various marketing campaigns, often portrayed as a male.

There are three dogs who play Bullseye taking turn during different promotional campaigns. Each Bullseye has a pure white coat, and has Target Corporation's bullseye logo painted around her left eye, which is the origin of her name. The makeup used on Bullseye is all-natural and non-toxic. Target also offers the dog as a stuffed toy for special events or employee recognition.

History 
The original Target dog who debuted in a 1999 commercial was American Kennel Club Champion Kingsmere Moondoggie, known as "Smudgie". The current mascot is a descendant from the breeder Skyline Bull Terriers, located in Massachusetts. In 2014 the mascot's real name was Nikki.

Bullseye dogs live on a ranch just north of Los Angeles trained by David McMillan, operator of Worldwide Movie Animals. In 2004, American artist Amy Brazil was commissioned to paint an 8-foot by 8-foot portrait of Bullseye, which now hangs at Target corporate headquarters.

See also
 List of individual dogs

References

Individual dogs
Male characters in advertising
Store brands
Animated characters
Corporate mascots 
Dog mascots
Target Corporation
Mascots introduced in 1999